"If You Can't Say No" is a song by American singer-songwriter Lenny Kravitz, released as the first single from his fifth studio album, 5 (1998), in April 1998. The song was written by Kravitz and reached number eight in Iceland, number nine in Spain and number 39 on the US Billboard Modern Rock Tracks chart, and also topped the airplay charts in Italy. Dance producer Brian Transeau and electronica band Zero 7 remixed the track. All instruments on the track were played by Kravitz.

Critical reception
Larry Flick from Billboard wrote, "The first radio slice of Kravitz's long-anticipated new collection, "5", shows the chameleon-like artist in excellent form—and donning the role of forlorn soul belter. Working within an instrumental context that carefully merges elements of electronica, classic funk, and traditional blues, the artist belts with a heartfelt authority that will make the hairs on the back of your neck stand up. Holding the track together is a subtle, pop-framed chorus that gradually seeps into the brain and is ultimately unshakable. Though none of 'em match the raw intensity of the original recording, several jeep and electronic remixes are included. In the end, they should do the trick in drawing newcomers to the Kravitz fold."

Music video
The music video for the song was directed by American filmmaker Mark Romanek. It consists of Kravitz performing in a futuristic blue room, while he is being illuminated by a floating lamp. Supermodel and actress Milla Jovovich made a notable appearance in the video as Kravitz's girlfriend. The music video won an award for Best Art Direction at the 8th Annual MVPA Awards in 1999.

Charts

Release history

References

1998 singles
Lenny Kravitz songs
Music videos directed by Mark Romanek
Song recordings produced by Lenny Kravitz
Songs written by Lenny Kravitz
Virgin Records singles